30 Years to Life may refer to:

 30 Years to Life (1998 film), an American television science-fiction film
 30 Years to Life (2001 film), an American comedy film